North Sydney ferry wharf (also known as High Street wharf) is located on the northern side of Sydney Harbour serving the Sydney suburb of North Sydney.

In June 2022, a replacement wharf opened to the left of the original wharf, with upgraded facilities.

Wharves & services
North Sydney wharf is served by Sydney Ferries Neutral Bay services operated by First Fleet class ferries.

References

External links
 North Sydney Wharf at Transport for New South Wales (Archived 13 June 2019)
North Sydney Local Area Map Transport for NSW

Ferry wharves in Sydney
North Sydney, New South Wales